Sir William Patrick Deane  (born 4 January 1931) is an Australian barrister and jurist who served as the 22nd governor-general of Australia, in office from 1996 to 2001. He was previously a Justice of the High Court of Australia from 1982 to 1995.

Deane received his undergraduate education at the University of Sydney, and later studied international law at The Hague Academy of International Law in the Netherlands. Prior to joining the judiciary, Deane worked for periods as a barrister and university lecturer. He was appointed to the Supreme Court of New South Wales in 1977, and later that year was also appointed to the Federal Court of Australia. Deane was elevated to the High Court in 1982, and during his tenure was generally considered to fall on the court's progressive side. He retired from the court in 1995, and the following year was appointed governor-general on the recommendation of Paul Keating. Deane had a low profile during his five-year term, facing no major constitutional issues, but did come to international notice by officially opening the 2000 Summer Olympics.

Early life
Deane was born on 4 January 1931 in Melbourne. He was the youngest of three children and only son born to Lillian Elizabeth and Cornelius Aloysius Deane. His father grew up in a large Catholic family in Wahring, Victoria, and won the Military Cross during World War I. He later worked as a patent examiner. The family moved to Canberra in 1933, and Deane grew up in the suburb of Griffith. He attended St Christopher's Convent School in Manuka and later boarded in Sydney at St Joseph's College, Hunters Hill. He won an exhibition and Canberra scholarship to attend the University of Sydney, where he graduated Bachelor of Arts and Bachelor of Laws and "won numerous scholarships, exhibitions and prizes". He was a member of the staff of the Sydney Law Review and served on the Student's Representative Council and as secretary and vice-president of the Sydney University Law Society. He also trained with the University Air Squadron and attained a pilot's licence. In 1954 Deane won a Rotary Foundation Fellowship to undertake postgraduate studies in Europe. He was awarded a diploma from The Hague Academy of International Law in 1955.

After graduation, Deane worked in the federal Attorney-General's Department in Canberra and at the law firm Minter Simpson (later to become Minter Ellison). He was called to the Sydney Bar in 1957 and also lectured in law at university.

Deane joined the Democratic Labor Party (DLP) in the 1950s and served on the party's executive. He later recalled having "very strong views on the threat of communism" at the time. He subsequently became disillusioned by factional disputes and ceased to have any involvement in politics.

Judicial career
In 1977 Deane was appointed a Judge of the Supreme Court of New South Wales and, in the same year, he was appointed to the Federal Court of Australia and as President of the Australian Trade Practices Tribunal. In June 1982 he was appointed to the High Court of Australia, replacing Sir Ninian Stephen on his appointment as Governor-General.  He received a knighthood in August 1982. On the court he formed part of the majority which recognised native title in the landmark Mabo case of 1992.

Governor-General

In August 1995, the Labor Prime Minister, Paul Keating, announced that Elizabeth II, Queen of Australia had agreed to the appointment of Deane as Governor-General to succeed Bill Hayden. Deane retired from the High Court in November and was sworn in as Governor-General on 16 February 1996. Less than a month later the Liberal/National coalition led by John Howard defeated Keating's government in the 1996 Australian federal election.

Deane was Australia's first Catholic governor-general. He "represented the Catholic social justice position on just about every issue that came forward".

As governor-general, Deane received praise for his role in publicly mourning the victims of tragedies that took place during his term in office, including the Port Arthur massacre (1996), the Thredbo landslide (1997) the Swiss canyoning disaster (1999) and the Childers Palace Backpackers Hostel fire (2000). His speech in Switzerland titled "It is still winter at home" was especially well received. He also was asked to deliver the eulogies at the funerals of several prominent Australians, including Don Bradman, Nugget Coombs, Roma Mitchell, Mark Oliphant, and Mum Shirl.

Deane's term of office was due to expire on 31 December 2000, but was extended by six months to cover the Centenary of Federation celebrations. Upon leaving office in June 2001, he stated that his main regret as governor-general was that Australia did not achieve Reconciliation by the end of the 20th century as he had hoped. Howard stated he had "displayed an unfailing interest in the place of the disadvantaged within Australian society".

Olympics

Deane officially opened the 2000 Summer Olympics, giving a brief speech in front of a crowd of 110,000 people at the Sydney Olympic Stadium. Prime Minister John Howard had originally planned to open the games himself, with the agreement of the organising committee and the International Olympic Committee (IOC). However, in November 1999 he changed his mind and advised the IOC that Deane would be opening the games. Howard said this was due to "a concern that my opening the Olympic Games would become a party political issue [...] I think in the long run it'll be better for the Olympic Games for the Governor-General to open them because we will be removing that one area of political controversy". Members of the opposition Labor Party had advocated that the Queen be asked to perform the honours, arguing that it was hypocritical for Howard to support the retention of the monarchy at the 1999 republic referendum but not call upon the Queen to represent Australia.

Later years

 Deane acted as Patron or co-Patron of a large number of charitable organisations working for the disadvantaged, including Matthew Talbot Homeless Services, Father Chris Riley's Youth off the Streets, the Starlight Foundation and the Australian Indigenous Education Foundation. He was also a Patron of Reconciliation Australia and of the Australian Indigenous Doctors Association.

The A.C.T. Government appointed him as Patron of the National Capital's 2013 Centenary Celebrations.

He is a former Patron and Chair of international aid-organization CARE Australia and a member of its advisory board.

Honours
Deane was appointed a Knight Commander of the Order of the British Empire (KBE) on 10 August 1982, a few weeks after being appointed to the High Court. On Australia Day 1988, he was made a Companion of the Order of Australia (AC). He is also a Knight Commander with Star of the Papal Order of St. Gregory the Great and a Knight of the Venerable Order of St. John.

In 2001, Deane was awarded the Sydney Peace Prize "for his consistent support of vulnerable and disadvantaged Australians and his strong commitment to the cause of reconciliation".

Personal life
Deane married solicitor Helen Russell on 6 January 1965. The couple had one son and one daughter. He was described in 2002 as "a devout Catholic who regularly attends Mass at St Christopher's, Canberra".

References

Further reading

External links
 Governor General of Australia – Official biography of Sir William Deane and Lady Deane, published by Government House, Canberra.
 A Mirror to the People, documentary film on the Office of Governor-General of Australia (1999), featuring Deane, Zelman Cowen and Ninian Stephen.
 High Court biography Retrieved 20 August 2014.

1931 births
Living people
Fellows of the Royal Society
Governors-General of Australia
Justices of the High Court of Australia
Judges of the Federal Court of Australia
Judges of the Supreme Court of New South Wales
Companions of the Order of Australia
Australian Knights Commander of the Order of the British Empire
Knights of the Order of St John
Australian people of Irish descent
Knights Commander with Star of the Order of St. Gregory the Great
Australian King's Counsel
20th-century King's Counsel
The Hague Academy of International Law people
Sydney Law School alumni
Australian Roman Catholics
People educated at St Joseph's College, Hunters Hill
People from Canberra